Jodi Nunnari, Ph.D is an American cell biologist and pioneer in the field of mitochondrial biology. She is currently an investigator at the biotechnology company Altos,  and Distinguished Professor in the Department of Molecular and Cellular Biology at the University of California, Davis and editor-in-chief of the Journal of Cell Biology. Nunnari served as president of the American Society for Cell Biology in 2018.

Nunnari was born in Cleveland, Ohio, and studied chemistry at the College of Wooster before obtaining a Ph.D. in pharmacology from Vanderbilt University, working with Lee Limbird. As a postdoctoral fellow with Peter Walter at the University of California, San Francisco, Nunnari pioneered the use of green fluorescent protein to visualize mitochondria in budding yeast, helping to establish the field of mitochondrial dynamics. Since obtaining an independent position at the University of California, Davis, Nunnari and colleagues have investigated the molecular mechanisms underlying mitochondrial fission and fusion and explored the structure and function of membrane contact sites that link mitochondria with other organelles.

Nunnari was named editor-in-chief of the Journal of Cell Biology in August 2015, becoming the first woman to serve in this position. She is a member of the American Society for Cell Biology and served as the society's president in 2018. She is also a member of the American Society for Biochemistry and Molecular Biology. Nunnari was elected as a member of the National Academy of Sciences in 2017, of the European Molecular Biology Organization in 2020, and of the American Academy of Arts and Sciences in 2021.

References

Year of birth missing (living people)
Living people
College of Wooster alumni
Vanderbilt University alumni
Cell biologists
University of California, San Francisco alumni
21st-century American biologists